The 1982 USA Outdoor Track and Field Championships was held from June 18 to 20 at Tom Black Track at LaPorte Stadium, on the campus of the University of Tennessee in Knoxville, Tennessee. The three-day competition served as the national championships in track and field for the United States. The meet was organized by The Athletics Congress.

Results

Men track events

Men field events

Women track events

Women field events

References

 Results from T&FN
 results

USA Outdoor Track and Field Championships
USA Outdoors
Track, Outdoor
Sports in Knoxville, Tennessee
USA Outdoor Track and Field Championships
Outdoor Track and Field Championships
Track and field in Tennessee